Claudio Tiribelli (born 6 October 1946) is an Italian hepatologist best known for his studies on bilirubin and Kernicterus, a bilirubin-induced neurological condition.

Scientific activity 

Since very early in his career, Tiribelli was fascinated by bilirubin. Expanding upon his research activity and expertise, he founded Bilimetrix together with Richard Wennberg. Bilimetrix developed the first point-of-care device for measuring bilirubin in newborns. Early detection of harmful bilirubin levels would prevent neonatal jaundice and allow the newborns to receive timely and proper treatment.

Due to his clinical activity and research interests, he is active in translational activity in several liver disorders as fatty liver disease and hepatocellular carcinoma. Together with his longstanding research associate Stefano Bellentani, he designed and performed the Dionysus Study, the first project exploring the prevalence and incidence of liver diseases in the general population.

Tiribelli is coordinating a large group of researchers (including postdoctoral fellows, PhD candidates, and senior researchers) located in the hub lab at the Italian Liver Foundation in Trieste. The international programs Claudio is coordinating forces him to cross the Equator 14 times in 2019 (before the COVID pandemic).

Scientific publications 
Claudio has over 350 scientific publications, some of his most cited works are:

 "Bilirubin-Induced Neurologic Damage — Mechanisms and Management Approaches"
 "Prevalence of chronic liver diseases in the general population of Northern Italy: The Dionysos study"
 "Prevalence And Risk Factors For Hepatic Steatosis In Northern Italy"
 "The fatty liver index: a simple and accurate predictor of hepatic steatosis in the general population"
 "Molecular basis and mechanisms of progression of nonalcoholic steatohepatitis (NASH)"
"Intestinal Integrity, the Microbiome and Inflammation"

References 
 

1946 births
Living people
21st-century Italian physicians
Physicians from Venice
Italian hepatologists
20th-century Italian physicians
University of Padua alumni
Academic staff of the University of Trieste